The 1986 LSU Tigers football team represented Louisiana State University during the 1986 NCAA Division I-A football season. The team was led by Bill Arnsparger in his third season and finished with an overall record of nine wins and three losses (9–3 overall, 5–1 in the SEC), as Southeastern Conference (SEC) champions and with a loss against Nebraska in the Sugar Bowl.

Schedule

Personnel

Rankings

Season summary

No. 7 Texas A&M

Ole Miss

at No. 6 Alabama

Notre Dame

vs. No. 6 Nebraska (Sugar Bowl)

References

LSU
LSU Tigers football seasons
Southeastern Conference football champion seasons
LSU Tigers football